Precis archesia, the garden inspector or garden commodore, is a species of butterfly in the family Nymphalidae, native to Subsaharan Africa.

Wingspan: 45–50 mm for males and 50–60 mm for females.

Flight period is year-round with two main broods between September to March and April to August.

Subspecies
P. a. archesia — Kenya, Tanzania, southern Democratic Republic of the Congo, Angola, Zambia to Zimbabwe, Botswana, Eswatini, South Africa: Limpopo Province, Mpumalanga, North West Province, Gauteng, KwaZulu-Natal, Eastern Cape Province, Western Cape Province to the south-east
P. a. ugandensis (McLeod, 1980) — Sudan, Uganda

Diet
Larval food plants include Plectranthus esculentus, Plectranthus fruticosus, Rabdosiella calycina, Pycnostachys reticulata, and Pycnostachys urticifolia.

References

Junoniini
Butterflies of Africa
Butterflies described in 1779